Tempted (foaled 1955 in Kentucky) was an American Champion Thoroughbred racehorse.

Trained by future U.S, Racing Hall of Fame inductee Henry Clark and usually ridden by Eldon Nelson, Tempted was a multiple stakes winner of important races for fillies. In 1959 she was voted American Champion Older Female Horse honors.

References
 Tempted's pedigree and partial racing stats

1955 racehorse births
Racehorses bred in Kentucky
Racehorses trained in the United States
American Champion racehorses
Du Pont racehorses
Thoroughbred family 4-r